DeKalb or De Kalb may refer to:

People
 Baron Johann de Kalb (1721–1780), major general in the American Revolutionary War

Places

Municipalities in the United States
 DeKalb, Illinois, the largest city in the United States named DeKalb
DeKalb High School (Illinois), in that city
 De Kalb, Mississippi, Kemper County
 De Kalb, Missouri, Buchanan County
 De Kalb, New York, St. Lawrence County
 DeKalb, Ohio, Crawford County
 De Kalb, Texas, Bowie County
 De Kalb, West Virginia, unincorporated community

Counties in the United States
 DeKalb County, Alabama
 DeKalb County, Georgia
 DeKalb County, Illinois
 DeKalb County, Indiana
 DeKalb County, Missouri
 DeKalb County, Tennessee

Street names

Interrelated locations in New York City 
 DeKalb Avenue, Brooklyn
 DeKalb Avenue (BMT Canarsie Line), a stop on the L train at Wyckoff Avenue
 DeKalb Avenue (BMT Fourth Avenue Line), a stop on the Fourth Avenue and Brighton lines at Flatbush Avenue
 DeKalb Avenue Line, now the B38 DeKalb/Lafayette Avenues bus route

Montgomery County, Pennsylvania 

 E. Dekalb Pike, W. Dekalb Pike and Dekalb Street are names of US Route 202 in Montgomery County in Pennsylvania. 
 DeKalb Street station, near US 202, a SEPTA commuter train station that connects to Philadelphia and Norristown, PA.

Townships in the United States
 DeKalb Township, DeKalb County, Illinois

Ships
 USS Baron DeKalb (1861), a Civil War ironclad river gunboat formerly known as the USS Saint Louis and used by the United States Army
 USS DeKalb (ID-3010), a decommissioned U.S. Navy ship formerly known as the Prinz Eitel Friedrich
 USS DeKalb County (LST-715), a twice-decommissioned U.S. Navy ship

Other
 DeKalb High School (disambiguation), the name of several high schools in the United States
 DeKalb–Peachtree Airport (PDK), Chamblee, DeKalb County, Georgia
 DeKalb School of the Arts, a magnet school in DeKalb County, Georgia near Atlanta
 DeKalb receptor, a fictional device in the science fiction story "Waldo" by Robert A. Heinlein
 DeKalb Genetics Corporation, a hybrid corn seed producer

See also 
 Kalp (disambiguation)